Norman James "Norm" Waugh (10 May 1874 – 6 August 1934) was an Australian rules footballer who played for the Essendon Football Club in the Victorian Football League (VFL). In the first year of competition, he became one of the club's and leagues first premiership players, during the 1897 VFL season, under the captaincy of George Stuckey. Waugh made his debut against  in Round 1 of the season, at Corio Oval. Waugh was also Essendon's first ever leading goalkicker in a VFL season. His 23 goals was the third highest in the League, behind Jack Leith of North Melbourne (26), and Eddy James of Geelong (27).

He was the youngest son of Dr James S. Waugh, the first president of Wesley College.  After retiring from football he entered the insurance industry and became the chief executive officer of the National Mutual Company in South Africa.  He died in Johannesburg in 1934, aged 60.

References

External links

 
 

1874 births
1934 deaths
Australian rules footballers from Melbourne
Essendon Football Club players
Essendon Football Club Premiership players
People educated at Wesley College (Victoria)
Essendon Football Club (VFA) players
One-time VFL/AFL Premiership players
People from Prahran, Victoria